Gordon Dalziel (born 16 March 1962) is a Scottish football player and manager. Dalziel spent most of his playing career with Raith Rovers, scoring 170 goals in 360 league appearances, and winning the 1994–95 Scottish League Cup. He also played for Rangers, Manchester City

Career
During his playing career he played as a striker for Rangers, Manchester City, Partick Thistle, East Stirlingshire, Raith Rovers and Ayr United. His greatest success was achieved at Raith Rovers as he became the club's record league goalscorer, winning the Scottish League Cup in 1994–95 (scoring in the final) as well as two First Division titles. He won the First Division Players' Player award twice at Rovers. Dalziel scored 202 goals in 378 appearances in total for Raith Rovers.

His first managerial job was at Ayr United where he guided them to the 2001–02 League Cup final and the Scottish Cup semi-final in the same year. He was later sacked, however, having failed to get the club to the Scottish Premier League.

He later took over as manager at Junior team Glenafton, who he left to take over at Raith Rovers in 2004, with the club in financial difficulty. In September 2006, he was asked by the Raith Rovers board to take no active part in the running of the team, while they discussed the terms on which he may leave the club.

In May 2007, he returned to junior side Glenafton as manager, taking over from the departing former Partick Thistle boss Gerry Collins and in October 2016 was appointed as an advisor on footballing matters at Scottish League One club Airdrieonians. Dalziel given the role of Director of Football at Airdrieonians on 31 October 2016, following the appointment of Mark Wilson as first team coach. Dalziel took charge of the team after Wilson left in June 2017, but the club had to appoint another coach (Willie Aitchison) due to his work for Radio Clyde. Dalziel left Airdrie in January 2018, after the club was taken over by new owners.

Honours

Player
Rangers
 Scottish League Cup: 1981–82
 Scottish Cup runner-up: 1981–82, 1982–83

Raith Rovers
 Scottish League Cup: 1994–95
 Scottish First Division: 1992–93, 1994–95

Individual
 Scottish First Division Top scorer: 1987–88, 1990–91, 1991–92, 1992–93
 SPFA First Division Player of the Year: 1991–92, 1992–93

Manager

Ayr United
 Scottish Second Division: 1996–97
 Scottish League Cup runner-up: 2001–02
 Scottish First Division runner-up: 2000–01

Glenafton Athletic
 West of Scotland Cup Winners: 2002–03

Individual
 SFL First Division Manager of the Month: November 1997, March 2001, February 2002
 SFL Second Division Manager of the Month: August 1996

References

External links
 

Living people
1962 births
Scottish footballers
Scottish Football League players
English Football League players
East Stirlingshire F.C. players
Rangers F.C. players
Manchester City F.C. players
Partick Thistle F.C. players
Raith Rovers F.C. players
Ayr United F.C. players
Scottish football managers
Ayr United F.C. managers
Glenafton Athletic F.C. managers
Raith Rovers F.C. managers
Footballers from Motherwell
Scottish Football League managers
Association football forwards
Airdrieonians F.C.